Physarum polycephalum ribonuclease is an enzyme. This enzyme catalyses the following chemical reaction

 Endonucleolytic cleavage to 5'-phosphomonoester

References

External links 

EC 3.1.26